Louis de La Forge (1632–1666) was a French philosopher who in his Tractatus de mente humana (Traité de l'esprit de l'homme, 1664; in English, "Treatise on the Human Mind") expounded a doctrine of occasionalism. He was born in La Flèche and died in Saumur. He was a friend of Descartes, and one of the most able interpreters of Cartesianism.

Bibliography 
1664, Traité de l’esprit de l’homme et de ses facultés ou fonctions et de son union avec le corps, Amsterdam.
ed. Abraham Wolfgang, Hildesheim ; New York, Georg Olms Verlag, 1984 
 Jacques Isolle, « Un Disciple de Descartes : Louis de La Forge », 1971, XVII siècle  n° 92, pp. 98–131

External links

French philosophers
1632 births
1666 deaths
French male non-fiction writers